Karkan-e Olya (also Romanized as Karkān-e ‘Olyā and Kargān-e ‘Olyā) is a village in Itivand-e Shomali Rural District, Kakavand District, Delfan County, Lorestan Province, Iran. At the 2006 census, its population was 244, in 38 families.

References 

Towns and villages in Delfan County